Kaurava is a Sanskrit term which refers to descendants of Kuru, a legendary king of India who is the ancestor of many of the characters of the epic Mahabharata. Usually, the term is used for the 100 sons of King Dhritarashtra and his wife Gandhari. Duryodhana, Dushasana, Vikarna and Chitrasena are the most popular among the brothers. They also had a sister named  Dussala and a half-brother named Yuyutsu.

Etymology 
The term Kauravas is used in the Mahabharata with two meanings:
The wider meaning is used to represent all the descendants of Kuru. This meaning, which includes the Pandava brothers, is often used in the earlier parts of popular renditions of the Mahabharata.
The narrower but more common meaning is used to represent the elder line of the descendants of Kuru. This restricts it to the children of King Dhritarashtra, excluding the children of his younger brother, Pandu, whose children form the Pandava line.

The rest of this article deals with the Kaurava in the narrower sense, that is, the children of Dhritarashtra by Gandhari. When referring to these children, a more specific term is also used –  (Sanskrit: धार्तराष्ट्र), a derivative of Dhritarashtra.

Birth of Kauravas
After Gandhari was married to Dhritarashtra, she wrapped a cloth over her eyes and vowed to share the darkness that her husband lived in.  Once Sage Krishna Dwaipayana Vyasa came to visit Gandhari in Hastinapur and she took great care of the comforts of the great saint and saw that he had a pleasant stay in Hastinapur. The saint was pleased with Gandhari and granted her a boon. Gandhari wished for one hundred sons who would be as powerful as her husband. Dwaipayan Vyasa granted her the boon and in due course of time, Gandhari found herself to be pregnant. But two years passed and still, the baby was not born. Meanwhile, Kunti received a son from Yama whom she called Yudhishthira. After two years of pregnancy, Gandhari gave birth to a hard piece of lifeless flesh that was not a baby at all. Gandhari was devastated as she had expected a hundred sons according to the blessing of Rishi Vyasa. She was about to throw away the piece of flesh while Rishi Vyasa appeared and told her that his blessings could not have been in vain and asked Gandhari to arrange for one hundred jars to be filled with ghee. He told Gandhari that he would cut the piece of flesh into a hundred pieces and place them in the jars, which would then develop into the one hundred sons that she so desired. Gandhari told Vyasa then that she also wanted to have a daughter. Vyasa agreed, cut the piece of flesh into one hundred and one-pieces, and placed them each into a jar. After two more years of patient waiting the jars were ready to be opened and were kept in a cave. Bhima was born on the same day on which Duryodhana was born thus making them of the same age. Arjuna, Nakula, and Sahadeva were born after Duryodhana was born.

Children of Dhritarashtra

According to the epic, Gandhari wanted a hundred sons and Vyasa granted her a boon that she would have these. Another version says that she was unable to have any children for a long time and she eventually became pregnant but did not deliver for two years, after which she gave birth to a lump of flesh. Vyasa cut this lump into a hundred and one-pieces and these eventually developed into a hundred boys and one girl.

The birth of these children is relevant to the dispute over the succession of the kingdom's throne. It attributes the late birth of Duryodhana, the eldest son of Dhritarashtra, despite his father's early marriage and legitimizes the case for his cousin Yudhishthira to claim the throne, since he could claim to be the eldest of his generation. All the sons of Dhritarashtra (excluding Yuyutsu) were killed in the Battle of Kurukshetra.

Names of the Kauravas
The Mahabharata notes the names of all Kauravas, of which only Duryodhana, Dushasana, Vikarna and Chitrasena play a significant role:
 Duryodhana
 Dushasana
 Vikarna
 Chitrasena
 Upachitran
 Suvarma 
 Dussaha
 Jalagandha
 Sama
 Saha
 Vindha
 Anuvindha
 Durdharsha
 Subahu
 Dushpradarshan
 Durmarshan
 Durmukha
 Dushkarna
 karna 
 Salan
 Sathwa
 Sulochan
 Chithra
 Chitraksha
 Charuchithra
 Sarasana
 Durmada
 Durviga
 Vivitsu
 Viktana
 Urnanabha
 Sunabha
 Nanda
 Upananda
 Chitravarma
 Suvarma
 Durvimochan
 Ayobahu
 Mahabahu
 Chitranga
 Chitrakundala
 Bhimvega
 Bhimba
 Balaki
 Balvardhana
 Ugrayudha
 Sushena
 Kundhadhara
 Mahodara
 Chithrayudha
 Nishangi
 Pashi
 Vridaraka
 Dridhavarma
 Dridhakshatra
 Somakirti
 Anudara
 Dridasandha
 Jarasangha
 Sathyasandha
 Sadas
 Suvak
 Ugrasarva
 Ugrasena
 Senani
 Dushparajai
 Aparajit
 Kundusai
 Vishalaksha
 Duradhara
 Dridhahastha
 Suhastha
 Vatvega
 Suvarcha
 Aadiyaketu
 Bahvasi
 Nagaadat
 Agrayayi
 Kavachi
 Kradhan
 Kundi
 Kundadhara
 Dhanurdhara
 Bhimaratha
 Virabahi
 Alolupa
 Abhaya
 Raudrakarma
 Dhridarathasraya
 Anaghrushya
 Kundhabhedi
 Viravi
 Chitrakundala
 Dirghlochan
 Pramati
 Veeryavan
 Dirgharoma
 Dirghabhu
 Kundashi
 Virjasa
The Kauravas also had a half-brother, Yuyutsu, and a sister, Duhsala.

Marriages and children of Kauravas
All the 100 Kauravas were mentioned to have wives in the Adi Parva. Some of them had children - Duryodhana was mentioned to have a Kalinga princess as his wife, named in folklores as Mayuri. They had 3 children - a son Laxman Kumara and two daughters named Lakshmana and one unnamed daughter. Lakshman Kumar participated in the Kurukshetra War and killed Shikhandi's son Kshatradeva on the 12th day of the war. He is killed by Abhimanyu on the 13th day of the War. Lakshmana was said to have married Krishna's son Samba, and they had a son Ushneek. Dushasana was also said to have  two sons, who killed Abhimanyu in the war. Dushasana's first son was ultimately killed by Shrutasena in the War. Dushasan's second son was killed by Abhimanyu and Dushasan also had an unnamed daughter. Chitrasena's son was said to have been killed by Shrutakarma in the Kurukshetra War. Chitrasena also had an unnamed daughter. However, it was mentioned that all these sons of the Kauravas were killed by the sons of the Pandavas.

In literature
Harivamsa Purana (8th century CE) narrates the Jain version of their story.

In popular culture 
The term Kaurava is used as the name of a fictional planetary system in the 2008 real-time strategy video game Warhammer 40,000: Dawn of War – Soulstorm, as well as the names of the system's planets.

See also
Kuru Kingdom

Reference

Sources

External links

 Persons and Stories from Mahabharata

 Characters in the Mahabharata
 Kingdoms of the Puru clan